Miho Komatsu is a Japanese singer-songwriter, record producer and lyricist who recorded eight studio albums, 26 singles, and three compilation album from 1997–2006.

Studio albums

Compilation albums

Singles

References

Discographies of Japanese artists
Pop music discographies